All-Time Greatest Hits is a compilation album by Australian-American pop singer Helen Reddy that was released in 1991 by EMI-Capitol Special Markets and reissued by various labels with different covers on multiple occasions since.



Reception

Stephen Thomas Erlewine of Allmusic writes, "All-Time Greatest Hits is a budget-priced, 10-track selection of Helen Reddy's best-known material from the '70s, and while there are some essential items missing [such as 'Keep On Singing', 'Emotion', and 'I Can't Hear You No More'], it still functions as a good, affordable sampler."

Track listing

 "I Don't Know How to Love Him" (Tim Rice, Andrew Lloyd Webber) – 3:15
 "I Am Woman" (Ray Burton, Helen Reddy) – 3:24
 "Peaceful" (Kenny Rankin) – 2:50
 "Delta Dawn" (Larry Collins, Alex Harvey) – 3:08
 "Leave Me Alone (Ruby Red Dress)" (Linda Laurie) – 3:26
 "You and Me Against the World" (Kenny Ascher, Paul Williams) – 3:08
 "Angie Baby" (Alan O'Day) – 3:29
 "Ain't No Way to Treat a Lady" (Harriet Schock) – 3:26
 "Somewhere in the Night" (Will Jennings, Richard Kerr) – 3:31
 "You're My World" (Umberto Bindi, Gino Paoli, Carl Sigman) – 2:45

Personnel

Helen Reddy – vocals
Jeff Wald – management
Tom Catalano – producer (except as noted)
Larry Marks – producer ("I Don't Know How to Love Him")
Jay Senter  – producer ("I Am Woman")
Joe Wissert – producer ("Angie Baby", "Ain't No Way to Treat a Lady", "Somewhere in the Night")
Kim Fowley – producer ("You're My World")
Earle Mankey – producer ("You're My World")

Notes

1991 greatest hits albums
Helen Reddy albums
Albums produced by Joe Wissert
Albums produced by Tom Catalano